Bonaventure Hinwood (12 February 1930 - 8 September 2016) was a Roman Catholic priest and Afrikaans poet. Hinwood was the first South African to join the Irish Province of the Franciscan Order in Pretoria, South Africa.

Conversion to Roman Catholicism  
Hinwood was baptized as a Methodist and later became an Anglican. Later, Hindwood discovered the Catholic Church and was received in October 1951. Two years after his reception, he felt the calling to become a priest. In 1953, Hinwood approached the Irish Province of the Franciscan Order based in Pretoria, South Africa. At the time, the Irish Province of the Franciscan Order staffed the Catholic Seminary in Pretoria. He became the first South African to join the Irish Province, where he took the name Bonaventure.

Awards 
Hinwood was awarded the Papal Recognition Pro Ecclesia et Pontifice during Mass held at St John Vianney Seminary in Pretoria, South Africa.

Writings 
 Race: The Reflections of a Theologian
 The Way Of The Cross

References 

1930 births
2016 deaths
South African Roman Catholic priests